Egbert Benson (June 21, 1746 – August 24, 1833) was an American lawyer, jurist, and politician, who represented New York State in the Continental Congress, Annapolis Convention, and United States House of Representatives. He served as a member of the New York constitutional convention in 1788 which ratified the United States Constitution. He also served as the first attorney general of New York, chief justice of the New York Supreme Court, and as the chief United States circuit judge of the United States circuit court for the second circuit.

Education and career

Benson's ancestor, Dirck Benson, who settled in New Amsterdam in 1649, was the founder of the Benson family in America. Egbert Benson was born in New York City in the Province of New York, the son of Robert Benson (1715–1762) and Catherine (Van Borsum) Benson (1718–1794). The Benson family was one of the earliest Dutch families to have settled in Manhattan. In a letter written to Arthur D. Benson, Egbert Benson lived at the corner of Puntine and Fulton streets in the home of William Puntine. His home was one of the centers of cultural life in New York City. Benson lived with his maternal grandmother, a widow who lived on Borad Street, at the corner of Beaver, during the early part of his life.

Benson was taught in Dutch, and he learned his catechism in that language. Upon reaching a suitable age, Benson attended the Collegiate School, a school of repute, and prepared himself for college. During this time, he was guided and assisted by Reverend Doctor Barclay, rector of Trinity Church. He was privately educated, then attended King's College (now Columbia University), graduating in 1765. He read law, was admitted to the bar and moved to Red Hook in Dutchess County, New York. He practiced law both there and in New York City. Benson was also honored by Harvard University and Dartmouth College.

A relative of Benson's was Benjamin Benson, a Revolutionary War soldier and member of the committee of correspondence. He signed one of the Articles of Association, or "Association Test", which was preliminary to the Declaration of Independence, at Haverstraw, New York, in May 1775. Egbert Benson was the brother of Lieutenant Colonel Robert Benson and Captain Henry Benson, who commanded an armed vessel in the Revolution.

Benson owned slaves; in the 1790 census, he was recorded as having one slave, and in the 1800 census, two slaves.  Despite his personal ownership of slaves, he was involved in the anti-slavery New York Manumission Society.

Political and judicial service

Towards the start of the American Revolutionary War, Benson approved the course of the Sons of Liberty and gave up, in a measure, his professional prospects then brightly opening and devoted himself to his country. He aided the Sons of Liberty, who were in Dutchess County where Benson, as a part of his first efforts, gave proper directions to the political meetings. When the British occupied New York City in 1776, Benson remained in Dutchess County for several years. From 1777 to 1781, Benson served as a member of the New York State Assembly and drafted every important bill passed there in during the Revolution. He was also a representative in the Second Continental Congress from 1780, and drew bills organizing the executive department of the United States. The county made him the president of their committee of safety and in 1777 sent him to the revolutionary New York State Assembly. When the first state government was organized, Benson was appointed the first New York attorney general and served until 1788. He was elected to the Assembly annually until 1781 and again in 1788.

New York sent Benson as a delegate to the Continental Congress in 1784. Although he was reappointed in 1785, he did not attend sessions. In 1786, he was named by the Legislature to accompany Alexander Hamilton as a delegate to the Annapolis Convention, which issued a call for the United States Constitutional Convention held the following year. He returned to the Congress in 1787 and 1788, and in 1788 attended the New York state convention that ratified the United States Constitution.

When the new federal government was established, Benson was elected from New York's 3rd congressional district to the United States House of Representatives of the 1st and 2nd United States Congresses, serving from March 4, 1789, to March 3, 1793. In 1794, Benson was appointed a justice of the New York Supreme Court, a position he held until 1801.

Benson was part of the three-man commission that decided the location of the St. Croix River in 1798. He was confirmed by the United States Senate on February 20, 1801, and received his commission the same day. His service terminated on July 1, 1802, due to abolition of the court.

Later life

Benson returned to the private practice of law in New York City in 1802. He joined other civic leaders to found the New-York Historical Society and served as its first president from 1804 to 1816. He was the author of several books, including Vindication of the Captors of Major Andre, defending the three American Patriots who captured the spy Major John André, which led to the discovery of the plot to surrender West Point to the British by Benedict Arnold.

In 1812, Benson was again elected from New York's 2nd congressional district to the United States House of Representatives of the 13th United States Congress as a Federalist but served only five months before he resigned on August 2, 1813. In December 1813, Benson was elected a member of the American Antiquarian Society.

Benson's writings include A Biographical Sketch of Gouverneur Morris (published in November 1816), and Brief Remarks on the 'Wife' of Washington Irving (published in 1819). Benson also wrote and published in the New York American a series of able and highly interesting articles, in condemnation of what he regarded as the absurd and anti-Christian practice of calling the first day of the week the Sabbath.

Benson married late in life, on May 17, 1820, to Maria Conover (1796–1867). He died on August 24, 1833, in Jamaica, Queens, and is buried in the Prospect Cemetery there. His grave has been designated by a historical marker.

Descendants and legacy

Egbert's oldest brother was clerk of the New York State Senate, Robert Benson (1739–1823), father of his namesake, Egbert Benson.

According to manuscripts and notes found in the Arthur D. Benson manuscript collection at Queens Library, Benson's name was engraved on a bronze tablet on the Butterick Building on 6th Avenue and Spring Street in New York City; this tablet was placed there by the Greenwich Village Historical Society. Hevelyn D. Benson, great-grandnephew of Egbert Benson, sent Jerome D. Greene, director of Harvard's Trancentanery, seven photostats concerning Egbert Benson. Hevelyn Benson was also a member of the New York Historical Society, founded in 1804 by his ancestor, Egbert Benson. Benson also included a photostat of an article in The Eagle from September 16, 1935, which designated Egbert Benson as the man behind the Constitution. The state historical marker for Benson's grave was applied to Senator Thomas C. Desmond, a trustee of the New York State Historical Society, by Hevelyn Benson.

Notes

References

External links 

 Guide to the Arthur D. Benson Genealogical Notes and Correspondence Concerning Egbert Benson and the Benson Family 1938 Control, manuscript collection finding aid, Archives at Queens Library

 Neither Separate Nor Equal: Congress in the 1790s
 

1746 births
1833 deaths
Politicians from New York City
Lawyers from New York City
People of the Province of New York
American people of Dutch descent
American members of the Dutch Reformed Church
Continental Congressmen from New York (state)
Pro-Administration Party members of the United States House of Representatives from New York (state)
Federalist Party members of the United States House of Representatives from New York (state)
New York State Attorneys General
Members of the New York State Assembly
New York Supreme Court Justices
Judges of the United States circuit courts
United States federal judges appointed by John Adams
United States federal judges admitted to the practice of law by reading law
American slave owners
Members of the New York Manumission Society
Members of the American Antiquarian Society
18th-century American judges
Columbia College (New York) alumni